HD 188405 is a binary star in the equatorial constellation of Aquila. The pair have an orbital period of roughly 425 years and an angular separation of 1.085″.

References

External links
 CCDM J19553-0644AB
 Image HD 188405

Aquila (constellation)
188405
Binary stars
F-type main-sequence stars
7599
Durchmusterung objects
098038